Shri Vedic Kanya Senior Secondary School, Abu Road is the girls' senior secondary school located in Abu Road city in Rajasthan state of India.  The school was set up by Arya Samaj on 1 August 1941.It was the first girls' school in Sirohi district. The school is being managed  by Arya Samaj. The school has permanent recognition for 10+2 level from Government of Rajasthan and Board of Secondary Education, Rajasthan.

References

High schools and secondary schools in Rajasthan
Girls' schools in Rajasthan
Education in Sirohi district
Educational institutions established in 1941
Schools affiliated with the Arya Samaj
1941 establishments in India
Abu Road